Garaguney or Karaguney may refer to:

Qaragüney, Kalbajar, Azerbaijan
Qaragüney, Sabirabad, Azerbaijan
Karaguney, Iran
Karagüney, Iğdır, Turkey